MTV Sports: Skateboarding Featuring Andy Macdonald is a sports video game developed by Darkblack and published by THQ for Game Boy Color, Microsoft Windows, PlayStation and Dreamcast. It features skateboarder Andy Macdonald on the cover.

Reception

The Dreamcast and PlayStation versions received "unfavorable" reviews according to the review aggregation website Metacritic. Jim Preston of NextGen said of the latter console version: "No matter what all the marketing tells you, this has all the grit and soul of an Egg McMuffin" calling it a "LAM3 SK8R".

The game was a runner-up for GameSpots annual "Worst Game" award among console games, which lost to Spirit of Speed 1937. The staff dubbed it as "unplayable and ugly".

Featured Skaters

 Andy Macdonald (skateboarder)
 Danny Way
 Sal Barbier
 Rob Dyrdek
 Stevie Williams
 Colin McKay
 Josh Kalis

Soundtrack
 OPM - “Heaven Is a Halfpipe”
 Pilfers - “Climbing”
 Goldfinger - “I’m Down”
 Deftones - “Street Carp”
 Cypress Hill - “(Rock) Superstar”
 System of a Down - “Sugar”
 Snapcase - “Twentieth Nervous Breakdown”
 Pennywise - “Might Be a Dream”
 No Use for a Name - “Life Size Mirror”

Notes

References

External links
 
 

2000 video games
Dreamcast games
Game Boy Color games
MTV video games
PlayStation (console) games
Skateboarding video games
THQ games
Video games developed in the United Kingdom
Windows games